Maylandia cyneusmarginata is a species of fish in the family Cichlidae. It is endemic to Lake Malawi. The blue marginal band on its fin and brown lappets distinguish it from other members of its genus.

References

cyneusmarginata
Fish of Lake Malawi
Fish of Malawi
Fish described in 1997
Taxobox binomials not recognized by IUCN
Taxonomy articles created by Polbot